XET-FM, nicknamed La Caliente, is an FM broadcasting station licensed for 25,000 watts on 94.1 MHz at Monterrey, Nuevo León, Mexico. It is part of Multimedios Radio's Monterrey station cluster.

References

External links
Radio Locator information for XET-FM

Radio stations established in 1957
Multimedios Radio
Radio stations in Monterrey